The 1984 Humboldt State Lumberjacks football team represented Humboldt State University during the 1984 NCAA Division II football season. Humboldt State competed in the Northern California Athletic Conference in 1984.

The 1984 Lumberjacks were led by head coach Bud Van Deren in his 19th season. They played home games at the Redwood Bowl in Arcata, California. Humboldt State finished winless, with a record of zero wins and ten losses (0–10, 0–6 NCAC). The Lumberjacks were outscored by their opponents 84–312 for the season, an average loss of 8–31.

Schedule

Notes

References

Humboldt State
Humboldt State Lumberjacks football seasons
College football winless seasons
Humboldt State Lumberjacks football